Songs of Christmas is the twenty-sixth album by Irish folk music group The Irish Rovers.

Track listing
 "Bells Over Belfast" - 3:24
 "God Rest Ye Merry, Gentlemen" - 3:03
 "Christmas Caroling" - 2:47
 "Away in a Manger" - 3:10
 "Good King Wenceslas" - 2:20
 "We Three Kings" - 3:18
 "The Christmas Traveller" - 3:03
 "What Child Is This?" - 3:53
 "Christmas in Killarney" - 2:59
 "Silent Night" - 3:13
 "Miss Fogarty's Christmas Cake" - 3:30
 "All Through the Night" - 3:39
 "Grandma Got Run Over by a Reindeer" - 3:26
 "We Wish You a Merry Christmas" - 3:10

Personnel
 George Millar - vocals, guitar, bouzouki
 Wilcil McDowell - accordion
 Joe Millar - vocals, bass, harmonica, melodeon
 John Reynolds - vocals, guitar, bass

1999 Christmas albums
Christmas albums by Canadian artists
Christmas albums by Irish artists
The Irish Rovers albums
Folk Christmas albums